Denis Mehigan (15 April 1890 – 6 September 1959) was an Irish Gaelic footballer who played as a centre-back for the Cork senior team.

Mehigan made his first appearance for the team during the 1912 championship and was a regular member of the starting fifteen until his retirement after the 1916 championship. A one-time captain of the Cork senior team, Mehigan enjoyed little success during his inter-county career.

At club level Mehigan was a multiple county championship medalist with Lees.

Mehigan hailed from a family with a strong association with Gaelic games. His older brother, Mick, captained Cork to the All-Ireland title in 1911. Another brother, Paddy, played both hurling and football for Cork and London and was later a pioneering Gaelic games journalist. A great grand-nephew, Owen Sexton, played for Cork in the 2000s.

References

 

1890 births
1959 deaths
Lees Gaelic footballers
Cork inter-county Gaelic footballers
Year of death missing